Local elections were held throughout Kosovo on 26 October 2002, organized by the Organization for Security and Co-operation in Europe (OSCE) and the United Nations Interim Administration Mission in Kosovo (UNMIK). This was the second local electoral cycle held in Kosovo after the start of the UNMIK mandate in 1999.

The 2002 local elections were held for municipal assemblies under a system of proportional representation. Once the municipal assemblies were constituted, the elected representatives in each jurisdiction selected an assembly president, who was recognized as having the rank of mayor. (Beginning with the next local electoral cycle in 2007, mayors were directly elected.)

The Serb community, which had generally boycotted the previous local elections in 2000, participated in the vote in five predominantly Serb municipalities: Zubin Potok, Zvečan, Leposavić, Novo Brdo, and Štrpce. In northern Kosovska Mitrovica, Serbs generally abstained from voting. Milan Ivanović, the leader of the Serbian National Council in northern Kosovo, said that UNMIK had not provided guarantees that the municipal authority in Kosovska Mitrovica would be decentralized, nor had it created adequate security and institutional conditions for Serb participation. He added that the Serb community was not boycotting the elections in northern Mitrovica, as such, but rather giving the international community the opportunity to organize new elections in six months' time if the conditions for participation had been achieved. In the rest of the province, Serb participation in the electoral process was minimal.

Results

Mitrovica District

Leposavić

Velimir Bojović of the Democratic Party of Serbia was chosen as mayor after the election.

Mitrovica

Incumbent mayor Faruk Spahija of the Democratic League of Kosovo was confirmed for another term in office after the election. He died of cancer in October 2005 and was replaced by Mursel Ibrahimi of the same party.

Skenderaj

Incumbent mayor Ramadan Gashi of the Democratic Party of Kosovo was confirmed for another term in office after the election.

Vushtrri

Incumbent mayor Muharrem Shabani of the Democratic League of Kosovo was confirmed for another term in office after the election.

Zubin Potok

Incumbent mayor Slaviša Ristić of the Democratic Party of Serbia was confirmed for another term in office after the election.

Zvečan

Dragiša Milović of the Democratic Party of Serbia was chosen as mayor after the election. Milan Ivanović of the Serbian National Council served as deputy mayor.

References

Local elections in Kosovo
2002 elections in Serbia
2002 in Kosovo
Kosovo